Ommersheim is a town in Saarland, Germany. It is in the municipality of Mandelbachtal, around 15 km by road east of Saarbrücken.

References

Towns in Saarland
Palatinate (region)